Sex Peak is a summit in Sanders County, Montana, in the United States. It is located within the Kootenai National Forest. It has an elevation of 

A conversation between a park official and a forester about sex supposedly caused the name Sex Peak to be selected.

Atop Sex Peak stands the Sex Peak Lookout Station, a decommissioned fire lookout tower which is now available for rental for overnight recreational visits from the United States Forest Service.

References

Mountains of Sanders County, Montana
Mountains of Montana